Donacaula is a genus of moths of the family Crambidae. The genus was erected by Edward Meyrick in 1890.

Four species of this genus are represented in the Palearctic region, four species in Africa, two species in the Oriental region, seven species in the Neotropical region and twenty-one in the Nearctic region.

Species
Donacaula albicostella (Fernald, 1888)
Donacaula aquilella Clemens, 1860
Donacaula caminarius (Zeller) (Ethiopian region)
Donacaula dispersella Robinson
Donacaula dodatellus (Walker, 1864) (Oriental)
Donacaula flavus de Joannis, 1929 (Oriental)
Donacaula forficella (Thunberg, 1794) (Palearctic)
Donacaula hasegawai (Shibuya, 1927) (Palearctic)
Donacaula ignitalis (Hampson, 1919) (Ethiopian region)
Donacaula immanis (Zeller, 1877) (Neotropical)
Donacaula longirostrallus (Clemens, 1860)
Donacaula maximellus (Fernald, 1891)
Donacaula melinella Clemens, 1860
Donacaula microforficellus (Amsel, 1956) (Neotropical)
Donacaula montivagellus (Zeller, 1863) (Neotropical)
Donacaula mucronella (Denis & Schiffermüller, 1775) (Palearctic)
Donacaula niloticus (Zeller, 1867) (Palearctic)
Donacaula nitidellus (Dyar, 1917)
Donacaula pallulellus (Barnes & McDunnough, 1912)
Donacaula phaeopastalis (Hampson, 1919) (Ethiopian region)
Donacaula porrectellus (Walker, 1863) (Neotropical)
Donacaula pulverealis (Hampson, 1919) (Neotropical)
Donacaula roscidellus (Dyar, 1917)
Donacaula rufalis (Hampson, 1919) (Ethiopian region)
Donacaula semifuscalis (Hampson, 1919) (Neotropical)
Donacaula sicarius (Zeller, 1863)
Donacaula sordidellus (Zincken, 1821)
Donacaula tripunctellus (Robinson, 1870)
Donacaula unipunctellus (Robinson, 1870)
Donacaula uxorialis (Dyar, 1921)

Former species
Donacaula amblyptepennis (Dyar, 1917)
Donacaula bicolorellus (F. Hoffmann, 1934)
Donacaula lanceolellus (Hampson, 1895)

Unpublished species
The species below were described in an unpublished doctoral dissertation by Edda Lis Martínez in 2010.
Donacaula flavusella
Donacaula linealis
Donacaula luridusella
Donacaula microlinealis
Donacaula ochronella
Donacaula parealis
Donacaula quadrisella
Donacaula ravella
Donacaula sinusella
Donacaula tannisella

References

Schoenobiinae
Crambidae genera
Taxa named by Edward Meyrick